Jim Sullivan is a former Democratic legislator who served in the Wisconsin Senate, representing the 5th District from 2007 to 2011.

Political campaigns
Sullivan entered politics in 1996 by running unsuccessfully for a seat on the Milwaukee County Board. In April 2000, Sullivan won a seat on the Wauwatosa Common Council. He was re-elected as alderman in 2004.

In 2006, he defeated Senator Thomas G. Reynolds (R-West Allis) by 3.5 percent of the vote.  In 2010, Republican State Representative Leah Vukmir (R-Wauwatosa) defeated Sullivan by 4.5 percent of the vote.

Shortly after losing his Senate seat, Sullivan ran in the 2011 primary election to succeed Scott Walker as Milwaukee County Executive. However, he placed third in the February primary, thus failing to advance to the April general election between the top two vote-getters.

Electoral history

References

External links
Jim Sullivan official campaign site
 

Wisconsin state senators
1967 births
Living people
Politicians from Astoria, Oregon
21st-century American politicians